Agata Sawicka (born 17 January 1985) is a Polish volleyball player, playing as a libero. She is part of the Poland women's national volleyball team.

She competed at the 2015 European Games in Baku. On club level she played for Impel Wrocław in 2015.

References

External links
https://web.archive.org/web/20190203101225/http://www.baku2015.com/news/article/turkey-win-women-volleyball-gold.html
 http://www.cev.lu/competition-area/PlayerDetails.aspx?TeamID=468&PlayerID=4273&ID=27
 http://www.zimbio.com/photos/Agata+Sawicka/Volleyball+Day+13+Baku+2015+1st+European+Games/Owp0Wj4FrFy

1985 births
Living people
Polish women's volleyball players
Sportspeople from Łódź
Volleyball players at the 2015 European Games
European Games silver medalists for Poland
European Games medalists in volleyball
21st-century Polish women